BillGuard is a personal finance security and productivity company. Its mobile and website application scans credit card and debit card transactions, alerting users to possible scams, billing errors, fraudulent charges and hidden fees.

As of October 2014, BillGuard reports it has flagged over $60 million of suspect charges on behalf of its users, drawing from over $1 billion of monitored transactions.

In September 2015, BillGuard was acquired by Prosper Marketplace. BillGuard was renamed Prosper Daily.

On August 31, 2017, Prosper ended Prosper Daily service, suggesting as alternative the Clarity Money app "which offers many of the same features as Prosper Daily."

BillGuard was named "one of the top online banking innovations of all time" by MarketConsensus. and a “Top 10 Tech Company” by American Banker.

BillGuard is also ranked as the "Top 2015 Most Powerful Financial Protection App" by AdvisoryHQ News.

Products

In July 2013, BillGuard released a free iPhone app that encourages users to take a more active role in monitoring their charges than the company's previous ‘set and forget’ web application. In May 2014, BillGuard released a free Android app.

BillGuard sends personalized data breach alerts that notify users if they've shopped at a merchant who has been breached.

BillGuard draws upon a combination of crowdsourced feedback from its users, data from the Consumer Financial Protection Bureau, complaints posted across the Internet, and its own algorithms to determine what charges to bring to users’ attention via email and smartphone push alerts.

BillGuard Resolve directly connects merchants with customers who wish to inquire about the merchants’ charges on their cards. BillGuard FI for financial institutions aims to lower those institutions’ transaction inquiry and dispute processing costs.

History
The company was founded in 2010 by Yaron Samid (CEO) and Raphael Ouzan (CTO), with $3 million in seed funding from Bessemer Venture Partners, Founder Collective, SV Angel, IA Ventures, Social Leverage and Yaron Galai.

BillGuard launched at TechCrunch Disrupt New York in May 2011, where it won the 2nd place prize. In 2011 the company raised a $10 million financing round from its seed funders plus Vinod Khosla’s Khosla Ventures, Peter Thiel’s Founders Fund and Eric Schmidt’s Innovation Endeavors. BillGuard was awarded the "2011 Big-Data Startup of the Year" at the O'Reilly Media Strata Conference, and won ‘Best of Show’ at the Finovate conference in both 2011 and 2012.

The Jerusalem Post writer Joseph Sherman notes: "Business Schools around the world study how the Rothschild family transformed the world of international banking. In a practical spin on the story, today, on Rothschild Boulevard in Tel Aviv, Raphael Ouzan is living his dream in Israel as the co-founder and Chief Technology Officer of a start-up that is changing how consumers monitor their credit and debit card spending, and helping us get our money back from unwanted and deceptive charges."

Grey Charges Report

In July 2013, BillGuard and the Aite Group released a comprehensive Grey Charges report that found in 2012 U.S. cardholders received over $14.3 billion in deceptive and unwanted credit and debit card charges. According to the report, one in three American card holders receives at least one grey charge each year, at an average of $215 per person per year.

References

Software companies of Israel
Financial services companies established in 2010
Online financial services companies of the United States
Internet properties established in 2010
IOS software
Finance websites